Disney's Animal Kingdom Villas is a Disney Vacation Club resort located at Disney's Animal Kingdom Lodge at the Walt Disney World Resort.

Disney's Animal Kingdom Villas is located in the Animal Kingdom Resort Area, adjacent to Disney's Animal Kingdom.

History
Disney's Animal Kingdom Villas is the eighth Disney Vacation Club timeshare resort, and the fifth located at the Walt Disney World Resort.

The first phase opened in summer 2007 and included 134 remodeled units (216 guest rooms) on the fifth and sixth floors of the existing Disney's Animal Kingdom Lodge, which opened in 2001. Later construction added 324 units (492 guest rooms) in a new building, Kidani Village, which opened in phases and was completed in 2009. The main building of Disney's Animal Kingdom Lodge is now named Jambo House in order to prevent confusion between the two buildings. The development was originally announced in October 2006.

Resort
Disney's Animal Kingdom Villas – Kidani Village is an African lodge-style resort with accommodations that include kitchenettes or kitchens and multi-bedroom units. The location features a 21-acre wildlife preserve.

The lobby and the villas of Kidani Village extend outwards and resemble the curlicue shape of a water buffalo's horns.

Inside, the resort features African-inspired architecture and decorations.

Outside the main building, wetlands border landscaping that features indigenous African shrubs and grasses.

Dining
Disney's Animal Kingdom Villas contains multiple dining establishments.  Authentic African and Indian cuisine is offered at three table service restaurants: Sanaa is located at Kidani Village, and next door at Disney's Animal Kingdom Lodge - Jambo House both Jiko – The Cooking Place and Boma - Flavors of Africa are located.  Counter Service offerings are also available at Jambo House at The Mara.  Drinks and some lighter snacks are also available at the pool bars and Kidani Village lobby.

Transportation
Disney's Animal Kingdom Villas is served by Disney Transport bus service which transports guests to the four major theme parks: Magic Kingdom, Disney's Animal Kingdom, Epcot, and Disney's Hollywood Studios.  Additional bus transportation is available to Disney Springs, Disney's Blizzard Beach, and Disney's Typhoon Lagoon.  Under most circumstances theme park buses first go to Kidani Village, and then to Jambo House when dropping off or picking up guests.  The Disney Springs buses go in the reverse order, starting at Jambo House and then to Kidani Village.  A shuttle van also runs between the two locations.

Recreation
The Sunset Savanna and the Pembe Savanna are home to different varieties of African animals.

Animals that can be observed on the savannas include the Ankole-Watusi, bontebok, common eland, zebra, greater kudu, impala, okapi, African wild asses, red river hog, mountain zebra, plains zebra, nyala, reticulated giraffe, roan antelope, sable antelope, Thomson's gazelle, waterbuck, blue wildebeest, Abyssinian ground hornbill, blue crane, Grey crowned crane, greater flamingo, marabou stork, ostrich, pink-backed pelican, spur-winged goose, guineafowl, and Rüppell's vulture.

Other recreational offerings include a 4,700-square-foot, zero-depth-entry pool with a 128-foot-long slide and wet deck, a barbecue pavilion, basketball (half court) and shuffleboard courts.

See also
 Disney's Animal Kingdom Lodge
 Disney Vacation Club

References

External links
 Animal Kingdom Villas  official site

Animal Kingdom Villas
2009 establishments in Florida